Tanzania mkomaziensis is a jumping spider that lives in Tanzania. It was originally known as Lilliput mkomaziensis.

References

Endemic fauna of Tanzania
Salticidae
Spiders described in 2000
Spiders of Africa
Fauna of Tanzania